Addicted to Company Pt. 1 is the third album by Irish singer Paddy Casey. It was released in Ireland on 7 September 2007, and in the US on 1 April  2008, by the Victor Records label.

Track listing
All tracks by Paddy Casey

 "Sound Barrier" – 4:36 
 "Addicted to Company" – 3:53
 "U'll Get By" – 4:54
 "Fear" – 3:44
 "Become Apart" – 5:10
 "City" – 5:03
 "Not Out to Get You" – 4:23
 "Refugee" – 3:45
 "Tonight" – 4:43
 "I Keep" – 3:30
 "Leaving" – 4:41
 "U and I" – 4:51
 "It's Over Now" – 6:53

Personnel 
Tom Bender – mixing assistant
David Bianco – percussion, backing vocals, handclapping, engineer, horn arrangements, foot stomping
Paddy Casey – electric Guitar, acoustic guitar, bass, harmonica, percussion, arranger, keyboards, vocals, backing vocals, wind, xylophone, handclapping, producer, engineer, horn arrangements, string arrangements
John Colbert – bass, backing vocals
 Andy Coogan - Guitars and Ebow
Pat Donne – arranger, drums, producer, engineer, horn arrangements, string arrangements
George Drakoulias – percussion, arranger, backing vocals, handclapping, producer, horn arrangements, foot stomping
Steve Ferrone – drums
James Gadson – drums
Mick Guzauski – mixing
Larry Hamby – A&R
Nicole Hudson – violin, viola
Bob Ludwig – mastering
Ray Martin – trumpet, horn, horn arrangements, string arrangements
Tim McGrath – drums
Rob O'Geibheannaigh – flute
Declan O'Rourke – backing vocals
David Ralicke – horn, horn arrangements
Rafael Serrano – assistant engineer

External links
MTV Artist Of The Week
Amazon.com

2007 albums
Paddy Casey albums
Rock albums by Irish artists